The Oracle is an album led by drummer Cindy Blackman which was recorded in 1995 and released on the Muse label.

Reception

Jason Ankeny of Allmusic stated simply, "Blackman took time off from touring with rocker Lenny Kravitz to cut her fourth record, on which she leads a band including bassist Ron Carter, pianist Kenny Barron and Gary Bartz on alto sax".

Ted Panken, writing for The Rolling Stone Jazz & Blues Album Guide, called the band "an all-star unit... at the peak of their powers," and commented: "The ensemble sound bears Blackman's indelible stamp; she's refined her conception to assert idiomatic individuality in a multiplicity of contexts."

Track listing 
All compositions by Cindy Blackman except where noted
 "The Oracle" – 9:31
 "Crazy He Calls Me" (Bob Russell, Carl Sigman) – 7:35
 "A.J." – 5:28
 "Beatrice" (Sam Rivers) – 6:32
 "Who Needs Forever? (Quincy Jones) – 5:28
 "Traffic" – 6:45
 "Why" – 5:21
 "Our Blues" – 7:25

Personnel 
Cindy Blackman - drums
Gary Bartz - soprano saxophone, alto saxophone 
Kenny Barron - piano 
Ron Carter - bass

References 

Cindy Blackman albums
1996 albums
Muse Records albums
Albums recorded at Van Gelder Studio